The canton of Bollène is a French administrative division in the department of Vaucluse and region Provence-Alpes-Côte d'Azur.

Composition
At the French canton reorganisation which came into effect in March 2015, the canton was expanded from 7 to 9 communes:
Bollène 
Lagarde-Paréol 
Lamotte-du-Rhône
Lapalud
Mondragon 
Mornas
Sainte-Cécile-les-Vignes  
Sérignan-du-Comtat
Uchaux

References

Bollene